Fear Factor India is an Indian adaptation of the popular reality show Fear Factor. The series premiered on Sony TV on March 10, 2006, and was presented by Indian television actor Mukul Dev. The season 2 and onward seasons of the series aired on the Indian channel Colors titled Fear Factor: Khatron Ke Khiladi.

Release
Fear Factor India — Jo Dar Ghaya So Mar Ghaya was a series that aired on SET India. Shot in the exotic locales of Kuala Lumpur, Malaysia.

Contestants
Every week a number of contestants (celebrities) participated in the show. The winner got Rs. 10 lakhs. In every episode new contestants participated.

 Mandira Bedi
 Chetan Hansraj
 Achint Kaur
 Tina Parekh
 Shweta Salve
 Vikas Bhalla 
 Arzoo Gowitrikar
 Akashdeep Saigal
 Manav Gohil
 Shweta Kawatra
 Sandeep Rajora
 Sweta Keswani

References

External links 
 

2006 Indian television series debuts
2006 Indian television series endings
01
Sony Entertainment Television original programming
Television shows set in Malaysia
Television shows filmed in Malaysia